Rebecca Brown may refer to:

 Rebecca Brown (swimmer) (born 1977), former Australian breaststroke swimmer
 Rebecca Brown (character), fictional character from the Australian drama Sea Patrol
 Rebecca Ore (Rebecca Brown, born 1948), American science fiction writer
 Rebecca Brown (author) (born 1956), American contemporary fiction writer
 Rebecca Jane Brown  (born 1992), British Trichotillomania spokesperson and vlogger
 Rebecca Latham Brown (fl. 1980s–2010s), American law professor
 Rebecca Brown Burton (born 1940), American romance writer